This is a list of life peerages in the Peerage of the United Kingdom created under the Life Peerages Act 1958 from 1997 to 2010, during the tenures of the Labour prime ministers Tony Blair and Gordon Brown.



Tony Blair (1997–2007)

† recommended by House of Lords Appointments Commission
 ‡ former MP  # former MEP

Gordon Brown (2007–2010)

† recommended by House of Lords Appointments Commission
 ‡ former MP  # former MEP

See also
 List of life peerages (complete list of life peerages granted since 1958)
 List of hereditary peers in the House of Lords by virtue of a life peerage

References

Notes

1997-2010
1990s in the United Kingdom
2000s in the United Kingdom